Bressuire (Poitevin: Beurseure) is a commune in the French department of Deux-Sèvres, region of  Nouvelle-Aquitaine. The town is situated on an eminence overlooking the Dolo, a tributary of the Argenton.

Notable buildings
Bressuire has two buildings of interest: the church of Notre-Dame, which, dating chiefly from the 12th and 15th centuries, has an imposing tower of the Renaissance period; and the castle, built by the lords of Beaumont, vassals of the viscount of Thouars. The latter is now in ruins, and a portion of the site is occupied by a modern château, but an inner and outer line of fortifications are still to be seen. The whole forms the finest assemblage of feudal ruins in Poitou.

The name
The name "Bressuire" comes from two elements, being Berg (hill) and Durum (fortress).   These two are linked in the name "Berzoriacum" recorded in 1029, and "Bercorium" from the start of the crusading era in 1095.   The name Bressuire thereby defines a fortress on a hill.

History
Bressuire dates back to Celtic times, and was at the meeting point of roads during the Gallo-Roman period.   The earliest surviving evidence of the town's existence, around the chapel of Saint Cyprien, dates back to the eleventh century.

Medieval Bressuire ("Castrum Berzoriacum") belonged to the viscounts of Thouars and comprised, in the tenth century, the three parishes of Notre Dame (Our Lady), St John and St Nicholas.   The parish of St Nicholas, which has since disappeared, was located within the walls of the castle and belonged to the Abbey of Saint-Jouin-de-Marnes.

Among the disasters suffered at various times by the town, its capture from the English and subsequent pillage by French troops under du Guesclin in 1370 is the most memorable.   Bressuire was part of the Ancien Régime Province of Poitou.

Population

Notable people
 
 
Guillaume Rouger (born 1975), retired professional footballer

Twin towns - sister cities
Bressuire is twinned with:

 Fraserburgh, Scotland, United Kingdom
 Friedberg, Germany
 Hodac, Romania
 Kpalimé, Togo
 Leixlip, Ireland
 Mequinenza, Spain
 Parczew, Poland
 Ryazan, Russia

See also
Communes of the Deux-Sèvres department

References

External links

Official website 

Communes of Deux-Sèvres
Subprefectures in France
Poitou